The Neo Naturists is a performance based live art practice started during the early 1980s in London, UK.

History
The Neo Naturists were started by Christine Binnie, Jennifer Binnie, and Wilma Johnson in 1981 in London. Grayson Perry appeared in many performances.  The most recent performance was at the Hayward Gallery in June 2012.  This was the first time the three main founders had performed together since 1986.  There were many performances in the interim years.

In the world of urban Thatcherism The Neo Naturists were seen as unfashionable hippies. With an enthusiastic spirit of anarchy, they used this unfashionability to enact a challenge. They challenged the highly fashionable Blitz Kids of the early 1980s by creating performances which brought smudged body paint, nudity, cooking, fish fingers, pancakes, calor gas, modern hunter gatherer carrier bags, bosoms, patchouli, sweat and messy exuberance into the heart of the self-conscious New Romantic club scene. Their work brought the aesthetics and vision of William Blake and Samuel Palmer, Cecil Collins and Neo-Romanticism of the 1940s into direct collision with the slick gesturing of New Image painting and Neo Expressionism.

The Neo Naturists subtextually, used their own female bodies in the context of the, often gay and exquisitely dandyesque, club scene, such as The Blitz, to play with feminist sexuality issues and sexual politics.  As living, naked paintings they performed ancient and modern rituals, everyday actions and rituals on stages lit like kitchens.  They juxtaposed ritual action with ‘common sense’ to create messy exuberant happenings.

The Neo Naturists have an intention to become Neo Naturist octogenarians and to continue performing with body paint on, into their 80s.

Timeline
 2006 – Neo Naturist Archive, B2, My Dead Gallery, London
 2006 – Neo Naturist Archive, Secret Public, Kunstverien, Munich
 2007 – Neo Naturist Archive, Secret Public, Institute of Contemporary Arts (ICA), London
 2007 – Neo Naturist Archive England and Co, London
 2008 – Neo Naturist Films Derek Jarman Super 8 film festival, The Gate Notting Hill and Ritzy Brixton
 2011 – Neo Naturist Archive, Camulodurum, First Site, Colchester
 2012 – Neo Naturist Films, Camulodruum, First Site, Colchester
 2012 – Neo Naturist Films, ICA, London
 2012 – Neo Naturist Life Class, Hayward Wide Open School
 2012 – Neo Naturist Films taken into BFI Collection

References

External links
 

Performance artist collectives